La Feuillée is a commune in the Finistère department of Brittany in north-western France.

Population
Inhabitants of La Feuillée are called in French Feuillantins. The population has been divided by three since the year 1881.

Geography

The village is situated in the Monts d'Arrée, a moorland area in the northern part of the Finistère. The village centre is the highest in Brittany. It is at an altitude of 275 meters. It is surrounded by several high peaks : the Roc'h Trevezel (385 meters), the Roc'h Tredudon (385 meters).

Map

See also
Communes of the Finistère department
Parc naturel régional d'Armorique

References

External links

Official website 

Mayors of Finistère Association 

Communes of Finistère